The Sikorsky S-8 Malyutka (baby) was a small Russian single engine aircraft built by the Russian Baltic Railroad Car Works shortly after Igor Sikorsky became chief engineer of the aircraft manufacturing division in 1912.

Design and development
The S-8 was a two bay biplane trainer powered by a  Gnome air-cooled rotary engine with the main wings and landing gear of similar design to the S-6-A. Completed early in the summer of 1912, the aircraft featured a side by side seating arrangement with controls that could be moved between the instructor and student. For improved downward visibility the lower wing had no fabric covering between the wing root and first rib.

Operational history
On the evening of 17 September 1912, Sikorsky piloted the S-8 on a ninety minute night flight from the Korpusnoi Aerodrome near Saint Petersburg. He landed with help of fires set at the airfield.

Specifications

References

S-8
Biplanes
Aircraft first flown in 1912
Rotary-engined aircraft